Kalasapakkam is a state assembly constituency in Tiruvannamalai district of Tamil Nadu, India. Its State Assembly Constituency number is 65. It comprises portions of the Kalasapakkam, Polur and Chengam taluks and is a part of the Tiruvannamalai Lok Sabha constituency for national elections to the Parliament of India. Elections were not held in 1957 and 1962. It is one of the 234 State Legislative Assembly Constituencies in Tamil Nadu, in India.

Madras State

Tamil Nadu

Election results

2021

2016

2011

2006

2001

1996

1991
0

1989

1984

1980

1977

1971

1967

1952

References 

 

Assembly constituencies of Tamil Nadu
Tiruvannamalai district